The Parnass Tower is an observation tower in the town of Plön in the North German state of Schleswig-Holstein. It sits on the summit of the low hill of Parnaß (a terminal moraine).

It is a 20-metre-high, steel, lattice tower built on a stone plinth with an observation platform 20 metres above the ground (and 85 metres above sea level).

The tower was erected in 1888 by the Plön Tourist Association (Plöner Verschönerungsverein).
Following renovation work in 1985 it has been reopened as an observation tower.

On the southern side of the stone base of the tower are three panels with:
 an Iron Cross with the coat of arms of Schleswig-Holstein and the dates 1848 and 1849 (in memory of the First Schleswig War)
 a portrait relief of Emperor William I
 an Iron Cross with a "W" and the date 1870 (in memory of the Franco-Prussian War)

From the top of the tower are views over the town of Plön and all of the surrounding countryside with its lakes.

External links 
 A Cordial Welcome to Plön 
 Plön (Parnass-Turm), Schleswig-Holstein: 1848-51, 1870/71 
 Parnass 

Plön
Buildings and structures in Plön (district)